The 2021 ITF Women's World Tennis Tour – Bellinzona was a professional women's tennis tournament played on outdoor clay courts. It was the first edition of the tournament which was part of the 2021 ITF Women's World Tennis Tour. It took place in Bellinzona, Switzerland between 5 and 11 April 2021.

Singles main-draw entrants

Seeds

 1 Rankings are as of 22 March 2021.

Other entrants
The following players received wildcards into the singles main draw:
  Ylena In-Albon
  Valentina Ryser
  Sebastianna Scilipoti
  Simona Waltert
  Joanne Züger

The following player received entry using a junior exempt:
  Alex Eala

The following players received entry from the qualifying draw:
  Lucia Bronzetti
  Lina Gjorcheska
  Vivian Heisen
  Seone Mendez
  Camilla Rosatello
  Raluca Șerban
  Lucrezia Stefanini
  Stephanie Wagner

The following player received entry as a lucky loser:
  Margot Yerolymos

Champions

Singles

 Julia Grabher def.  Lucia Bronzetti, 6–2, 6–3

Doubles

 Anna Danilina /  Ekaterine Gorgodze def.  Rebecca Marino /  Yuki Naito, 7–5, 6–3

References

External links
 2021 ITF Women's World Tennis Tour – Bellinzona at ITFtennis.com
 Official website

2021 ITF Women's World Tennis Tour
2021 in Swiss tennis
April 2021 sports events in Switzerland